The Gastein Ladies was a new addition to the WTA Tour in 2007.

Top seed Francesca Schiavone won her first career title over the unseeded Austrian Yvonne Meusburger, 6–1, 6–4.

Seeds

Draw

Finals

Top half

Bottom half

Qualifying

Seeds

Qualifiers

Qualifying draw

First qualifier

Second qualifier

Third qualifier

Fourth qualifier

External links 
 Draws

2007 Singles
Gastein Ladies Singles
Gast
Gast